Pilsbryspira albinodata, common name the white-noded turret is a species of sea snail, a marine gastropod mollusk in the family Pseudomelatomidae, the turrids.

Description
The length of the shell varies between 12 mm and 23 mm.

Distribution
This ùarine species occurs off Southeast Florida, USA; off the West Indies; in the Pacific Ocean off Panama to Nicaragua

References

External links
 
 Gastropods.com: Pilsbryspira albinodata

albinodata
Gastropods described in 1846